Yelimbetovo (Yälembät) is a rural locality (a selo) and the administrative centre of Saraysinsky Selsoviet, Sterlibashevsky District, Bashkortostan, Russia. The population was 373 as of 2010. There are 7 streets.

Geography 
Yelimbetovo is located 41 km southeast of Sterlibashevo (the district's administrative centre) by road. Umetbayevo is the nearest rural locality.

References 

Rural localities in Sterlibashevsky District